Wheatland Press is an independent book publisher, specializing in science fiction, fantasy, and horror short story and poetry collections.  It was founded in 2002 by Deborah Layne.  Although the number of books it produced tailed off significantly in 2006, Wheatland Press has published some remarkable work in a very short time, including works by Ben Peek, Bruce Holland Rogers, Lucius Shepard, Steven Utley, Jerry Oltion, and Howard Waldrop.  The Press's series of original anthologies, Polyphony, has consistently ranked among the best in the field.

On January 29, 2009, Layne announced the press was going on hiatus.

References

External links
 
 LiveJournal

2002 establishments in Oregon
American speculative fiction publishers
Book publishing companies of the United States
Publishing companies established in 2002
Science fiction publishers
Small press publishing companies